WMLL (96.5 FM; "96.5 The Mill") is an American radio station licensed to Bedford, New Hampshire, with studios located on Commercial Street in Manchester, New Hampshire. WMLL is owned by Saga Communications, via subsidiary Saga Communications of New England LLC.

History 
The 96.5 FM frequency first signed on in May 1996 with test broadcasts under the call letters WAEF. Regular broadcasting began on June 27, with a rock format branded "96.5 The Fox;" the call letters were soon changed to WOXF. The station was originally owned by Donna MacNeil.

On July 1, 1997, Saga Communications announced that it had signed a time brokerage agreement to take over WOXF's operations; on July 29, Saga relaunched the station as "Cool 96.5," an oldies station. The call letters were changed to WQLL on August 15, 1997; that month, Saga bought the station outright in a $3.3 million deal that was concluded on November 21, 1997. The station switched to classic rock, branded as "96.5 The Mill", in March 2005; on March 17, the call letters became WMLL. In August 2011, WMLL shifted to a classic hits format. In October 2016, WMLL returned to classic rock, branded as "Iconic Rock".

References

External links

MLL
Manchester, New Hampshire
Bedford, New Hampshire
Hillsborough County, New Hampshire
Classic rock radio stations in the United States
Radio stations established in 1996
1996 establishments in New Hampshire